James Cockburn Thoms (1869 – ?), was a Scottish born, South African international lawn bowls player who competed in the 1930 British Empire Games and 1934 British Empire Games.

Bowls career
At the 1930 British Empire Games he won the silver medal in the singles.

Personal life
While in Scotland he resided at Edgemont Gardens, Langside, Glasgow.

References

South African male bowls players
Bowls players at the 1930 British Empire Games
Bowls players at the 1934 British Empire Games
Commonwealth Games silver medallists for South Africa
Commonwealth Games medallists in lawn bowls
1869 births
Year of death missing
Medallists at the 1930 British Empire Games